Ju Jeong-hyeon (also transliterated Joo Jung-hyun, born 31 August 1974) is a South Korean equestrian. He competed in two events at the 2004 Summer Olympics.

References

External links
 

1974 births
Living people
South Korean male equestrians
Olympic equestrians of South Korea
Equestrians at the 2004 Summer Olympics
Place of birth missing (living people)
Asian Games medalists in equestrian
Equestrians at the 2006 Asian Games
Asian Games silver medalists for South Korea
Asian Games bronze medalists for South Korea
Medalists at the 2006 Asian Games